Baron Leitrim was a title in the Peerage of Ireland which was first created in 1583 for Seán mac an Iarla a Búrc, and became extinct in 1591 on the death of his son, Redmond, second Baron. The title's Second Creation was in 1783 for Robert Clements who was later created Earl of Leitrim.

Barons Leitrim (1583)
Seán mac an Iarla a Búrc or John Burke, 1st Baron Leitrim, or "John of the Shamrocks" (d.1583)
Redmond Burke, Baron Leitrim (d.1602)

Barons Leitrim (1783)
Robert Clements, 1st Earl of Leitrim (1732–1804), created Baron Leitrim in 1783; Viscount Leitrim in 1794; and Earl of Leitrim in 1801
 See Earl of Leitrim for further Barons Leitrim of this creation

See also
House of Burgh, an Anglo-Norman and Hiberno-Norman dynasty founded in 1193

References

Extinct baronies in the Peerage of Ireland
Noble titles created in 1583
Noble titles created in 1783